Grunhutte is a hamlet within the commune of Ottmarsheim, Haut-Rhin, in eastern France.

Villages in Grand Est